Charles Guillimin (1676 – February 27, 1739) was a Canadian entrepreneur.

Guillimin arrived in New France in the late 17th century with enough capital to pursue a number of enterprises, including ship building, outfitting of ships, and a variety of mercantile endeavours. In 1712, he loaned the king's treasury a large sum of money to avert a financial crisis.

Guillimin had numerous close ties within the Canadian business community both through marriage and business connections. His largesse of 1712 brought recognition by his installation as a councillor in the Conseil Supérieur of New France. He was singled out for praise by Governor Charles de Beauharnois and Intendant Gilles Hocquart. His fortune disappeared later in life.

References

External links
 Biography at the Dictionary of Canadian Biography Online

1676 births
1739 deaths
Businesspeople from Quebec
People of New France